Marin Karmitz (born 7 October 1938) is a Romanian-French businessman whose career has spanned the French film industry, including director, producer, film distributor, and operator of a chain of cinemas.

Karmitz attended film school at IDHEC (renamed La Fémis) and worked as a director of photography after graduating.

Karmitz founded MK2, a production company and movie theater chain, which has specialized in creating, distributing, and screening independent or "auteurist" cinema, including short films.

In 2005, he turned over leadership of the MK2 company and its theaters to his son, Nathanaël.

Exhibitions
• 2010:"Un parcours dans la collection de Marin Karmitz", exhibited at Rencontres d'Arles festival, France.

References

External links 

)

French businesspeople
French film directors
French film producers
French Maoists
Commandeurs of the Ordre des Arts et des Lettres
Commandeurs of the Légion d'honneur
Romanian emigrants to France
1938 births
Living people
Cinema chains in France